Ocneria is a genus of tussock moths in the family Erebidae.

Species
Ocneria amabilis (Christoph, 1887)
Ocneria detrita (Esper, 1785)
Ocneria eos Reisser, 1962
Ocneria rubea (Denis, & Schiffermüller, 1775)

References
Natural History Museum Lepidoptera genus database

Lymantriinae
Moth genera
Taxa named by Jacob Hübner